Narayanan Vaghul  (Born 1936) is a Philanthropist and an ex banker professional from India.  He was awarded Padma Bhushan in the Trade and Industry category in 2010 by the Government of India.

Early life 
Born in a remote village in South India, he was second in a family of eight children. He studied at Ramakrishna School, Chennai and graduated from Loyola College, Madras University in the late 1950s.

Career 
Narayanan joined the State Bank of India as an officer. He served in State Bank of India's branches in Trichi and Madras (city now renamed as Chennai) before moving to Bombay (city now renamed as Mumbai) in the 1960s.

Narayanan Vaghul resigned from the State Bank of India and took up a teaching position at the National Institute of Bank Management (NIBM). Within two years, he became its director.

In 1978, he became the executive director at Central Bank of India and served for two years there. Appointed as chairman and managing director of the Bank of India in 1981, he became one of India's youngest chairman of a nationalised bank at the age of 44. He was the chairman of the Bank of India till 1984.

In 1985, he was appointed as chairman and managing director of the then Industrial Credit and Investment Corporation of India (ICICI), the financial institution now known as ICICI Bank. He transformed ICICI from public financial institution to India's largest private bank. After relinquishing executive powers in 1996, he was its non-executive chairman till 2009.

Narayanan was awarded as the Business Man of the Year Award in 1991 by 'Business India’, The lifetime achievement award by the Times publications, The Economic Times Lifetime Achievement Award. Narayanan had also served as a director in many major companies of India including Wipro (since June, 1997), Mahindra & Mahindra, Apollo Hospitals and Mittal steel. Narayan is also the Chairman of Give_India, one of India's NGOs.

Narayan received the award of Corporate Catalyst — Forbes Philanthropy award in 2012 for his active involvement and assisting philanthropy causes.

References

External links
http://www.thesmartceo.in/magazine/cover-story/the-wise-leader.html

Living people
Loyola College, Chennai alumni
Indian bankers
1936 births
Recipients of the Padma Bhushan in trade and industry